Thomas Samuel Ashe (July 21, 1812 – February 4, 1887) was a slave owner, member of the Confederate Congress,  and U.S. Congressman from North Carolina.

Early years
Born in Hawfields, Orange County, North Carolina, he attended Bingham's Academy in Hillsborough, then the University of North Carolina at Chapel Hill, graduating in 1832. He was admitted to the bar in 1834 and began to practice law in Wadesboro, North Carolina in 1835.

Politics
In 1842, Ashe was elected to a single term in the North Carolina House of Commons. From 1847 to 1851 he was solicitor of the fifth judicial district of North Carolina, and in 1854, he served in the North Carolina Senate. During the American Civil War, Ashe served in the Confederate House of Representatives from 1861 to 1864, and was elected to the Confederate Senate in 1864, but the war concluded before he was able to serve.

In 1868, Ashe ran unsuccessfully for Governor as the nominee of the "Conservative" party, then the name of the state Democratic Party. He accepted the nomination only after Zebulon B. Vance and Augustus Merrimon declined to run. In this election, waged under the supervision of the U.S. military and allowing African Americans to vote in large numbers for the first time, Ashe was defeated by the Republican nominee, William Woods Holden. This was the same election in which the new state constitution was approved by the people. Ashe and the Conservatives opposed the new constitution.

Ashe was elected for two terms in the United States House of Representatives, serving from March 4, 1873 to March 3, 1877. Although he chose not to run again in 1876, he was elected an associate justice of the North Carolina Supreme Court in 1878 and re-elected in 1886.

Death
Ashe was still serving on the court at the time of the death in Wadesboro in 1887.

Thomas Samuel Ashe was the cousin of fellow Congressmen John Baptista Ashe and William Shepperd Ashe.

References

External links
 

1812 births
1887 deaths
Ashe family
North Carolina lawyers
Democratic Party members of the North Carolina House of Representatives
Democratic Party North Carolina state senators
Justices of the North Carolina Supreme Court
Members of the Confederate House of Representatives from North Carolina
Democratic Party members of the United States House of Representatives from North Carolina
19th-century American politicians